The Courage Bowl is an annual American college football bowl game that has been played every year starting in 2005.

The Courage Bowl features an annual match-up of Brockport and St. John Fisher. The game is played at Eunice Kennedy Shriver Stadium and Growney Stadium, both located near Rochester, New York. Co-founded by the University of Rochester and St. John Fisher College in 2005, the Courage Bowl benefits Camp Good Days and Special Times, an organization that provides experiences for children diagnosed with cancer and other diseases. These children participate in the game as honorary coaches and cheerleaders.

Game results

References

External links
 Courage Bowl XV (2019) Event Website
Courage Bowl XVI (2021) Event Website

College football bowls
Annual sporting events in the United States
Sports in Rochester, New York
Recurring sporting events established in 2005
2005 establishments in New York (state)